

Highest-grossing films

List of films
A list of films released in Japan in 2003 (see 2003 in film).

See also
2003 in Japan
2003 in Japanese television

External links
 Japanese films of 2003 at the Internet Movie Database

2003
Japanese
Films